An-Nazla al-Wusta is a Palestinian village in the Tulkarm Governorate in the eastern West Bank, located 17 kilometers North-east of Tulkarm.

History

Ottoman era
Pottery remains from the Ottoman era have been found here.

In 1882, the PEF's Survey of Western Palestine described Nuzlet el Wusta as a hamlet smaller than Nuzlet et Tinat, and located "on a spur, with a few trees."

British Mandate era
In the 1945 statistics the population of Nazla el Wusta was 60 Muslims, with 1,609 dunams of land according to an official land and population survey. Of this, 264 dunams were plantations and irrigable land, 428 were used for cereals, while 2 dunams were built-up (urban) land.

Jordanian era
In the wake of the 1948 Arab–Israeli War, and after the 1949 Armistice Agreements, An-Nazla al-Wusta came under Jordanian rule. It was annexed by Jordan in 1950.

In 1961, the population of Nazla Wusta was 128.

Post 1967
Since the Six-Day War in 1967, An-Nazla al-Wusta has been under Israeli occupation.

According to the Palestinian Central Bureau of Statistics, an-Nazla al-Wusta had a population of approximately 415 inhabitants in mid-year 2006. 38.7% of the population of an-Nazla al-Wusta were refugees in 1997. The healthcare facilities for an-Nazla al-Wusta are based in an-Nazla ash-Sharqiya, where the facilities are designated as MOH level 2.

References

Bibliography

External links
Welcome To al-Nazla al-Wusta
Survey of Western Palestine, Map 11:  IAA, Wikimedia commons

Villages in the West Bank
Tulkarm Governorate
Municipalities of the State of Palestine